I'll Be There is a 2010 Filipino drama film directed by Maryo J. Delos Reyes and starring the father-and-daughter Gabby Concepcion and KC Concepcion, and Jericho Rosales. It is Star Cinema's offering for Father's Day and premiered in cinemas nationwide on June 16, 2010.

The film had international screenings in select cities in the United States such as San Francisco, CA, Milpitas, CA, Cerritos, CA, Ontario, CA, San Diego, CA, Seattle, WA, Honolulu, HI, Las Vegas, NV, and Bergenfield, NJ.

Plot
The story revolves around Maxi dela Cerna, a young, aspiring New York-based fashion designer who returns to the Philippines shortly after her mother's death to find her father. She had been swindled by her ex-boyfriend and hopes to pay off her debts by selling the piece of provincial land that her parents co-owned. But this means spending time with her father whom she hates for walking out on her and her mother 15 years ago. As the uptight and guarded Maxi struggles to immerse herself in farm life and deal with a father she despises, she crosses paths again with Tommy, her childhood friend, now an architect who is trying to heal from his own mistakes in the past with his 7-year-old son.

Cast
Gabby Concepcion as Poch dela Cerna
KC Concepcion as Maxi/Mina dela Cerna
Jericho Rosales as Tommy Santibanez
Gee-Ann Abrahan as Sheila
Celia Rodriguez as Conching Collins
Luz Valdez as Bebang
Mickey Ferriols as Teresa
Cacai Bautista as Honey
Ikey Canoy as Oscar
Empress Schuck as Portia
Bugoy Cariño as Pio
Sheila Marie Rodriguez as Melissa

Reception
The film only garnered a total of ₱21.7 million on its first five days in theaters. The film ranked third on its opening weekend in the Philippine box office, behind Toy Story 3 and The Karate Kid.

References

External links

2010 films
2010s English-language films
Star Cinema films
2010s Tagalog-language films
2010 multilingual films
Philippine multilingual films
Films directed by Maryo J. de los Reyes